Welcome – Baazi Mehmaan Nawazi Ki is an Indian reality television television series broadcast on Life OK. The series premiered on 21 January 2013. A second season aired in April to May 2014.

Overview
The show is an Indian version of the international series Come Dine with Me.  Each week a group of five contestants takes turns to act as host, cooking a three-course meal and entertaining the other four. At the end of the evening the guests give an overall score to reflect their enjoyment of the evening. The contestants of the first season of Welcome were Indian celebrities, but in the second season were applicants drawn from the general public. Unlike the original Come Dine With Me, Welcome has an on-screen host - television actor Ram Kapoor - in addition to an off-screen narrator.

Contestants

References

Indian reality television series
Life OK original programming
2013 Indian television series debuts
2013 Indian television series endings
Come Dine With Me